McEachron is a surname. Notable people with the surname include:

Gordon McEachron (1919–1993), American football coach and United States Army Air Forces officer
Karl B. McEachron (1889–1954), American electrical engineer
Trevor McEachron (born 1983), American soccer player

See also
MacEachron